Jeanne Hebbelynck (née Dutry, June 20, 1891 - May 8, 1959) was a Belgian artist, children's book illustrator, and designer whose major themes were Roman Catholicism and childhood. She was made a chevalier Order of the Crown (Belgium) on November 14, 1936.

Her children with Léon Hebbelynck (1878-1951) were Jacques (1915-2003), Martine (1920-1942) and Geneviève (1923).

Hebbelynck's extensive works were published primarily in French, but some were also translated into Flemish and English.

Bibliography 
La légende de la Reine Astrid
Arlequin
Trois Histoires de Noël
L'Ane de Bethléem
La Merveilleuse Histoire de la Sainte Vierge
Cinq Contes de Noël
La Prière des Petits
Petites Contes de Chez Nous (1938)
Les Douzes Fruits du Saint-Esprit
Le Petit Communiant
Le Manteau de Roi
Madones au Pays de Flandre

References 
Guy Zelis, Les intellectuels catholiques en Belgique francophone aux 19e et 20e siècles (Louvain, 2009)
Céline Kesteloot, ''Jeanne Hebbelynck, haar leven en werk, met œuvre-catalogus (Leuven, 2004)

External links 
 Jeanne Hebbelynck in ODIS - Online Database for Intermediary Structures  

1891 births
1959 deaths
Recipients of the Order of the Crown (Belgium)
Artists from Ghent
Belgian children's book illustrators
Belgian women illustrators